Anthony S. Fell, OC is a Canadian businessman who was formerly chairman and CEO of RBC Dominion Securities (RBC DS), the corporate and investment banking subsidiary of the Royal Bank of Canada (RBC).

From 1980 to 2000, he was the chief executive officer of Dominion Securities, which RBC purchased a majority stake in 1988 and completely acquired in 1996; thereafter Fell assumed the title of Deputy Chairman of RBC from 1998 to 2000, making him the number two executive after John Cleghorn, the chairman and CEO of the bank holding company RBC. In 2000, Fell relinquished his Deputy Chair title and was succeeded as CEO of RBC Capital Markets by Gord Nixon (who would succeed Cleghorn as CEO of RBC in 2001), and that year RBC DS was also rebranded to RBC Capital Markets (RBC CM). Fell remained Chairman of RBC CM until he retired in 2007.

After retiring from RBC, Fell remains a corporate director. He sits on the board of directors of multiple corporations, including BCE Inc., CAE Inc., and Loblaw Companies In 2001, he was made an Officer of the Order of Canada.

External links
 Order of Canada citation

Living people
Canadian businesspeople
Officers of the Order of Canada
St. Andrew's College (Aurora) alumni
Year of birth missing (living people)